David Ruff Piper (born 2 December 1930) is a British former Formula One and sports car racing driver from England.  He participated in 3 Formula One World Championship Grands Prix, debuting on 18 July 1959.  He scored no championship points.

Racing career

Early career and Formula One
Piper was born in Edgware, Middlesex and began his career in the mid-1950s by competing in sprints and hill-climbs, before beginning circuit racing with a Lotus Eleven. He then moved up to a Lotus 16 which he used in 1959 and 1960 to compete in both Formula One and Formula Two, by means of changing engines as appropriate. His best result with the car was a second place in the Lady Wigram Trophy, in 1960, behind Jack Brabham in a Cooper.

In 1961, Piper competed in European Formula Junior alongside Jo Siffert but drove the Gilby F1 car in the Gold Cup. He also competed in non-championship races in 1962, but had become disenchanted with single-seater racing and moved into sports car racing initially with a Ferrari GTO.

Later career
Between 1962 and 1970, Piper raced frequently in many locations worldwide using his personally owned Ferraris and, later, Porsches. He was moderately successful and gained a reputation for reliability and consistency.

Piper crashed a Porsche 917 during the 1970 shooting of the film Le Mans and lost part of one leg.

Piper later raced his personal, green, Porsche 917 and other cars in historic events.

Racing record

Complete Formula One World Championship results
(key)

Complete British Saloon Car Championship results
(key) (Races in bold indicate pole position; races in italics indicate fastest lap.)

† Events with 2 races staged for the different classes.

24 Hours of Le Mans results

Gallery

References

English racing drivers
English Formula One drivers
World Sportscar Championship drivers
24 Hours of Le Mans drivers
12 Hours of Reims drivers
24 Hours of Daytona drivers
Brighton Speed Trials people
People from Edgware
1930 births
Living people